Alain Corneau (7 August 1943 – 30 August 2010) was a French film director and writer.

Corneau was born in Meung-sur-Loire, Loiret. Originally a musician, he worked with Costa-Gavras as an assistant, which was also his first opportunity to work with the actor Yves Montand, with whom he would collaborate three times later in his career, including Police Python 357 (1976) and La Menace (1977). He directed Gérard Depardieu in the screen adaptation of Tous les matins du monde in 1991.

Corneau died in Paris on 30 August 2010 from cancer, aged 67 and was interred at Père Lachaise Cemetery.

Filmography
France, Inc. (1973)
Police Python 357 (1976)
La Menace (1977)
Série noire (1979)
Choice of Arms (1981)
Fort Saganne (1984)
 (1986)
Nocturne Indien (1989)
Tous les Matins du Monde (1991)
New World (1995)
Le cousin (1997)
Le prince du Pacifique (2000)
Stupeur et Tremblements (2003)
Words in Blue (2005)
Le Deuxième souffle (2007)
Love Crime (2010)

References

External links

1943 births
2010 deaths
People from Loiret
French film directors
Best Director César Award winners
Deaths from cancer in France
Place of death missing
French male screenwriters
French screenwriters
Burials at Père Lachaise Cemetery